The 2019 Supercopa MX was a Mexican football match-up played on 14 July 2019, and is the most-recent edition of the Supercopa MX. It was contested by the champions of the Apertura 2018 Copa MX, Cruz Azul, and the champions of the 2018 Supercopa MX, Necaxa, due to the Clausura 2019 Copa MX champion América competing in the 2019 Campeón de Campeones. Like the previous four editions, the 2019 Supercopa MX was contested in a single-leg format at a neutral venue in the United States. This match took place at the Dignity Health Sports Park in Carson, California for the fourth consecutive year.

The 2019 Supercopa MX was part of a doubleheader, which also included the 2019 Campeón de Campeones, organized by Univision Deportes, Soccer United Marketing (SUM), Liga MX, and LA Galaxy.

Match details

See also
Apertura 2018 Copa MX
Clausura 2019 Copa MX

References

2019
2019–20 in Mexican football